Events from the year 1777 in Sweden

Incumbents
 Monarch – Gustav III

Events

 7 June - Gustav III visit Catherine the Great in Russia. 
 - The construction of the Strömsholm Canal begins. 
 - The 1711 regulations of midwives, with demands of a license after approval of the medical authorities, until then in practice only enforced in the capital, are enforced in the entire country.

Births

 15 June - Hedda Hjortsberg, ballerina  (died 1867)
 - Hedvig Amalia Charlotta Klinckowström, miniaturist (died 1810)
 - Per Krafft the Younger, painter (died 1863)
 - Mateli Magdalena Kuivalatar, folk singer (died 1846)
 Louise von Fersen, courtier  (died 1849)
 Eva Fundin, actress and dancer (died 1800)

Deaths

 6 April - Jacob Johan Anckarström the Elder, knight and colonel (died 1729)
 17 November - Johan Stålbom, painter (died 1712)
 Louise Du Londel, actor (born 1740)
 Ulrica Catharina Stromberg, courtier (born 1710)

References

 
Years of the 18th century in Sweden
Sweden